List of Balao-class submarines and their dispositions. 120 of these boats were built during and after World War II, commissioned from February 1943 through September 1948, with 12 commissioned postwar. This was the most numerous US submarine class. Nine of the 52 US submarines lost in World War II were of this class, along with five lost postwar, including one in Turkish service in 1953, one in Argentine service in the Falklands War of 1982, and one in Peruvian service in 1988. Also,  flooded and sank while fitting out at the Boston Naval Shipyard on 15 March 1945. She was raised but not repaired, and was listed with the reserve fleet postwar until struck in 1958. Some of the class served actively in the US Navy through the middle 1970s, and one (Hai Pao ex-) is still active in Taiwan's Republic of China Navy.

This, combined with generally less wartime service than previous classes, led to the Balao and Tench classes being preferred for modernization programs and active postwar service. 36 Balaos were modernized under various GUPPY conversion programs, plus 19 received the more austere "Fleet Snorkel" modernization, often in connection with foreign transfers.

SS-361 through SS-364 were initially ordered as Balao-class, and were assigned hull numbers that fall in the middle of the range of numbers for the Balao class (SS-285 through SS-416 & SS-425–426). Thus, in some references they are listed with this class. However, they were completed by Manitowoc as Gatos, due to an unavoidable delay in Electric Boat's development of Balao-class drawings. Manitowoc was a follow yard to Electric Boat, and was dependent on them for designs and drawings.

Cancellations
A total of 125 U.S. submarines were cancelled during World War II, all but three between 29 July 1944 and 12 August 1945. References vary considerably as to how many of these were Balaos and how many were Tenches. This yields 10 cancelled Balao-class, SS-353-360 and 379-380. The Register of Ships of the U. S. Navy differs, considering every submarine not specifically ordered as a Tench to be a Balao, and further projecting SS-551-562 as a future class. This yields 62 cancelled Balao class, 51 cancelled Tench class, and 12 cancelled SS-551 class. This article follows the information in the "Register". The cancelled hull numbers, including those launched incomplete, were SS-353-360 (Balao), 379–380 (Balao), 427–434 (Balao), 436–437 (Tench), 438–474 (Balao), 491–521 (Tench), 526-529 (Tench), 530–536 (Balao), 537-550 (Tench), and 551-562 (SS-551 class).

Abbreviations
Abbreviations and hull classification symbols for postwar redesignations/conversions:
 AGSS — auxiliary submarine (various roles including sonar testing and some pierside trainers)
 FS — "fleet snorkel" conversion, including a snorkel and streamlined sail
 G IA, G II, etc. — various GUPPY conversions, usually including a snorkel, streamlined sail, improved batteries, and upgraded sonar and electronics
 IXSS — unclassified submarine
 PT — pierside trainer for naval reservists, reportedly immobilized by removing the propellers
 SSA/ASSA - cargo submarine
 SSG — guided missile submarine
 SSP/ASSP/APSS/LPSS — amphibious transport submarine
 SSR — radar picket submarine
 Struck — Struck (deleted) from the Naval Vessel Register, usually followed by scrapping or other final disposal, or sale to a foreign navy

Ships in class

See also
 List of most successful American submarines in World War II
 List of lost United States submarines
 List of Gato-class submarines
 List of Tench-class submarines

References

Further reading
 

  Different pagination than 1977 edition.

External links 

 Description of GUPPY conversions at RNSubs.co.uk
 GUPPY and other diesel boat conversions page (partial archive)
 Navsource.org fleet submarines photo and data index page

 
Balao 
Balao